Sanghi Takht is a village in Afghanistan, located midway between Herat and Kabul at 34° 16' 02" N  and 66° 16' 30" E.
Its mountainous location causes temperature variation from -20°c to 11°c. with most precipitation in Winter.
The population is generally Hazari.

References

Villages in Afghanistan